Sheringham Point Lighthouse is located on Vancouver Island, British Columbia, near the community of Shirley. Built in 1912 following the fatal wreck of the SS Valencia six years earlier, it is still used for navigation. The point was named for William L. Sheringham who took part in various naval surveys although not in this area.

The lighthouse and surrounding property is currently owned by the Canadian Coast Guard and fenced off, though the lighthouse can be seen easily from a trail beside the fence. , the Sheringham Point Lighthouse Preservation Society is working to acquire the property from the Coast Guard and turn it into a public park.

Oceanographic research

From 1968 to 1989, the Sheringham Point Light was part of the British Columbia Shore Station Oceanographic Program, collecting coastal water temperature and salinity measurements for the Department of Fisheries and Oceans everyday for 21 years.

Sheringham Point Lighthouse Preservation Society

The Sheringham Point Lighthouse Preservation Society (SPLPS) was established in 2003 by local residents of Shirley, British Columbia, when the Canadian Coast Guard suggested deeming the Sheringham Point Lighthouse and its surrounding lands as 'surplus'. The SPLPS's mission is “to preserve the Sheringham Point Lighthouse structures and property; to ensure, through education, research, community action and consensus building, that the Sheringham Point Lighthouse, surrounding property and historic access routes remain accessible to the community and visitors now and in the future; to document and recognize the historical importance of the Sheringham Point Lighthouse and those who lived and worked there.”

In 2010, the Canadian Department of Fisheries and Oceans (DFO) officially declared the lightstation and surrounding lands surplus.

On May 29, 2015, The Honourable Leona Aglukkaq, Minister of the Environment and Minister responsible for Parks Canada, announced that 74 heritage lighthouses across Canada had been designated under the Heritage Lighthouse Protection Act.

ON June 8, 2015, the SPLPS received a letter from Minister Aglukkaq, indicating that the Sheringham Point Lighthouse was included on that list. Meanwhile, the Society and the Capital Regional District (CRD) have been working together to acquire the station and lands to create a park accessible to the public.

At an Apr 3, 2017 news conference, the SPLS announced the largest ever private donation to a lighthouse in Canada. The Westaway Charitable Foundation will be assisting the restoration with $550,00 over several years.

Keepers
 Eustace Travanion Arden (1912 – 1946)
 Tom Charles Cross (1946)
 Alfred Dickenson (1946 – 1948)
 Thomas Westhead (1948 – )
 Frederick Arthur Mountain (1959 – 1968)
 James D. Bruton (1968 – 1987)
 Kurt Cehak (1987 – 1989)

See also
 List of lighthouses in British Columbia
 List of lighthouses in Canada
 Henri de Miffonis

References

External links

 Aids to Navigation Canadian Coast Guard
 Information from Lorne's Lighthouses
 Sheringham Point Lighthouse Preservation Society

Lighthouses completed in 1912
Lighthouses in British Columbia
Heritage sites in British Columbia
1912 establishments in British Columbia
Lighthouses on the Canadian Register of Historic Places